Bricolage is a 1997 album by Brazilian electronic music artist Amon Tobin. It was Tobin's second album, the first released under his own name, and his first on the Ninja Tune label. The album was a departure from his first album, Adventures in Foam (as Cujo), incorporating a heavier blend of jazz melodies and intense jungle rhythms. The album was followed by Permutation in 1998.

The album art for Bricolage depicts part of Alexander Liberman's Olympic Iliad sculpture, located at the base of the Space Needle in Seattle, Washington.

Reception

Ryan Schreiber of Pitchfork gave Bricolage a maximum rating of 10/10, praising Amon Tobin for the way he produced an album of old jazz music with modern technology, such as samplers and electric keyboards. Sean Cooper of AllMusic stated that the album was consistently engaging and blurred the distinction between jungle and jazz. In 2015, Fact ranked the album at 23 on its list of "The 50 Best Trip-Hop Albums of All Time," where they described it as a midway point between IDM and the "moodier landscapes" of several trip hop artists.

Soundtrack appearances
The track "Easy Muffin" was used in Toonami advertisements for Gundam SEED as well as several episodes of IGPX. It is also used in the 2002 film Divine Intervention and in many episodes of Top Gear. It is also played on the second episode of the first series of Almost Human. "Easy Muffin" has also been used in Lincoln Motor Company television ads starting in 2015.

Track listing

References

External links
 Listen to Bricolage on amontobin.com
 Bricolage at the Ninja Tune discography (includes audio clips).
 

1997 albums
Amon Tobin albums
Ninja Tune albums